Jaamac Liibaan  is a village in Burao District, in the Togdheer region of Somaliland.

See also

References

Populated places in Togdheer